Vítor Vianna (born November 2, 1979) is a Brazilian mixed martial artist, who has competed in mixed martial arts events in Brazil, Holland, and in the United States. He is ranked as the #69 Light Heavyweight fighter in the world by FightMatrix.com. This ranking is due to certain Catchweight fights he has participated in. He is also a highly decorated Brazilian Jiu-Jitsu competitor and is a; 2 time World Champion, 6 time Brazilian National Champion, 15 time State Champion, and ADCC NO GI Brazilian trials runner-up. Vianna is signed to the Bellator Fighting Championships.

Background
Vítor Vianna grew up in Espírito Santo, Brazil. He began his martial arts training in Brazilian Jiu-Jitsu at the age of 15 at the Alliance BJJ Academy in Sao Paulo, Brazil under Fabio Gurgel. He was also trained by Daniel Gracie for one year in Rio de Janeiro, Brazil. He is a 2nd degree black belt under Rodrigo Medeiros, and Eduardo Jamelao. As a Brazilian Jiu-Jitsu Competitor he is a highly decorated champion and known throughout the world. After becoming two time World Champion Vitor decided to transition to MMA and did so in 2004. After 12 professional fights, his only loss was a TKO (referee stoppage) for a broken arm he sustained while blocking a kick by UFC fighter Thiago Silva.

Mixed martial arts career
Since 2004, Vitor Vianna has competed in mixed martial arts events around the world. Prior to this he was a highly decorated Brazilian Jiu-Jitsu competitor. He is a; 2 time World Champion, 6 time Brazilian National Champion, 15 time State Champion, and ADCC NO GI Brazilian trials runner-up. In the ADCC NO GI Brazilian trials he faced Roger Gracie in the finals, who is considered the best Brazilian Jiu-Jitsu fighter in the world. Vitor lasted 13 minutes with Roger Gracie but ultimately lost via submission and became the runner-up. Vitor is a member of Wanderlei Silva's the Wand Fight Team and is the head Brazilian Jiu-Jitsu instructor, and MMA instructor there. In addition to training with and teaching at the Wand Fight Team, Vitor is the main training partner for UFC fighter and Pride Champion Wanderlei Silva.

Bellator Fighting Championships
Vianna made his Bellator debut as a participant in the Bellator Season 5 Middleweight Tournament. In the opening round, he defeated Sam Alvey via split decision at Bellator 50. In the semifinal round, Vianna defeated Bryan Baker via TKO in the first round at Bellator 54. He faced Alexander Shlemenko in the tournament finals and lost the fight via unanimous decision.

Personal life
Vitor Vianna is married with one daughter. He lives and trains in Las Vegas, Nevada. When he is not training, Vitor enjoys spending time with friends and family.

Mixed martial arts record

|  Loss
|align=center| 12–3–1
| Brian Rogers
| KO (flying knee)
| Bellator 61
| 
|align=center| 1
|align=center| 4:14
|Bossier City, Louisiana, United States
| Bellator Season 6 Middleweight Tournament Quarterfinal
|-
|  Loss
|align=center| 12–2–1
| Alexander Shlemenko
| Decision (unanimous)
| Bellator 57
| 
|align=center| 3
|align=center| 5:00
|Rama, Ontario, Canada
| Bellator Season 5 Middleweight Tournament Final
|-
| Win
|align=center| 12–1–1
| Bryan Baker 
| TKO (punches)
| Bellator 54
| 
|align=center|1
|align=center|0:54
|Atlantic City, New Jersey, United States
|Bellator Season 5 Middleweight Tournament Semifinal
|-
| Win
|align=center| 11–1–1
|Sam Alvey
| Decision (split)
| Bellator 50
| 
|align=center|3
|align=center|5:00
|Hollywood, Florida, United States
|Bellator Season 5 Middleweight Tournament Quarterfinal
|-
| Win
|align=center| 10–1–1
| Aaron Brink
| TKO (punches)
| Millennium Events: MMA Xplosion
| 
|align=center| 1
|align=center| 1:17
|Las Vegas, Nevada, United States
| 
|-
| Win
|align=center| 9–1–1
| B.J. Lacy
| Submission (rear-naked choke)
| MMA Xplosion: Vianna vs. Lacy
| 
|align=center| 1
|align=center| 2:02
|Las Vegas, Nevada, United States
|
|-
| Win
|align=center| 8–1–1
| Gatta Tjaad
| TKO (punches)
| Beast of the East
| 
|align=center| 1
|align=center| N/A
| Zutphen, Holland
| 
|-
| Loss
|align=center| 7–1–1
| Thiago Silva
| TKO (arm injury)
| Fury FC 2: Final Combat
| 
|align=center| 1
|align=center| 1:50
| Sao Paulo, Brazil
| 
|-
| Win
|align=center| 7–0–1
| Danilo Pereira
| Decision (unanimous)
| Fury FC 2: Final Combat
| 
|align=center| 3
|align=center| 5:00
| Sao Paulo, Brazil
| 
|-
| Win
|align=center| 6–0–1
| Francis Carmont
| Decision (unanimous)
| Kam Lung: Only the Strongest Survive 5
| 
|align=center| 2
|align=center| 5:00
| Zutphen, Holland
|
|-
| Win
|align=center| 5–0–1
| Joao Assis
| TKO (punches)
| Fury FC 1: Warlords Unleashed
| 
|align=center| 1
|align=center| 1:57
| Sao Paulo, Brazil
| 
|-
| Win
|align=center| 4–0–1
| Michael Knaap
| Submission (flying armbar)
| Beast of the East
| 
|align=center| 3
|align=center| N/A
| Zutphen, Holland
|
|-
| Draw
|align=center| 3–0–1
| Moise Rimbon
| Draw
| Future Battle
| 
|align=center| 3
|align=center| 5:00
| Holland
|
|-
| Win
|align=center| 3–0
| António Conceição
| KO (spinning wheel kick)
| Hurricane
| 
|align=center| 3
|align=center| N/A
| Curitiba, Brazil
| 
|-
| Win
|align=center| 2–0
| Murilo Assuncao
| Submission (rear-naked choke)
| Storm Samurai 7
| 
|align=center| 2
|align=center| 4:33
| Curitiba, Brazil
|
|-
| Win
|align=center| 1–0
| Genivaldo Barbosa
| Submission (rear naked choke)
| Shooto Brazil: Never Shake
| 
|align=center| 1
|align=center| N/A
| Sao Paulo, Brazil
|

References

External links
 

Living people
Sportspeople from Espírito Santo
Brazilian male mixed martial artists
Middleweight mixed martial artists
Mixed martial artists utilizing Brazilian jiu-jitsu
Mixed martial artists utilizing Muay Thai
Brazilian Muay Thai practitioners
Brazilian practitioners of Brazilian jiu-jitsu
People awarded a black belt in Brazilian jiu-jitsu
1979 births